Mark Brooke-Cowden (born 12 June 1963) is a New Zealand former rugby union and rugby league footballer. In rugby union he played as a flanker. In rugby union, he won 3 caps for the All Blacks between 1986 and 1987 and was a member of the victorious New Zealand squad at the 1987 Rugby World Cup. He then switched to rugby league, and played professionally in England.

Playing career

County Cup Final appearances
Mark Brooke-Cowden played right-, i.e. number 12, (replaced by interchange/substitute Paul Medley) in Leeds' 33–12 victory over Castleford in the 1988 Yorkshire County Cup Final during the 1988–89 season at Elland Road, Leeds on Sunday 16 October 1988.

References

External links

All Blacks Profile

1963 births
Living people
Auckland rugby union players
Halifax R.L.F.C. players
Keighley Cougars players
Leeds Rhinos players
New Zealand international rugby union players
New Zealand rugby league players
New Zealand rugby union players
New Zealand expatriate sportspeople in England
Ponsonby RFC players
Rugby league second-rows
Rugby union flankers
Salford Red Devils players